Rachel Vincent is a Trinidadian cricketer who plays for the Trinidad and Tobago women's national cricket team in the Women's Super50 Cup and the Twenty20 Blaze tournaments. In April 2021, Vincent was named in Cricket West Indies' high-performance training camp in Antigua. In June 2021, Vincent was named in the West Indies A Team for their series against Pakistan.

References

External links
 

Year of birth missing (living people)
Living people
Trinidad and Tobago women cricketers
Place of birth missing (living people)
Guyana Amazon Warriors (WCPL) cricketers